Inga stenophylla is a species of plant in the family Fabaceae. It is found only in Costa Rica.

References

stenophylla
Flora of Costa Rica
Endangered plants
Taxonomy articles created by Polbot